Abdullah Al-Salloum (Arabic: عبد الله السلوم; Tribe: Wuhiba, Banu Tamim; born Abdullah Salim Abdullah Al-Salloum, August 28, 1981) is a Kuwaiti economist, entrepreneur, investor and author, who is known for his publications on the principles of political economics as well as for originating new accounting techniques that have been dedicated to public domain as part of social responsibility.

Early life and education 
Al-Salloum was born on August 28, 1981, in Kuwait. He earned his master's degree in business administration and his bachelor's degree in computer science from Gulf University for Science and Technology. He's also earned a certification of international project management from the American Academy of Financial Management.

Career 
After a decade in the private sector, Al-Salloum joined the public sector in 2021 as advisor to the Minister of Commerce and Industry and then appointed director of the Center of Strategic Research and Development in the Insurance Regulatory Unit.

Al-Salloum led the transformation of supervision on the insurance sector by establishing IruSoft; an in-house implemented platform that introduces unique supervision-technology (suptech), insurance-technology (insurtech) and regulatory-technology (regtech) modules, by which the unit requires less resources to ensure fairness, transparency and competition and to prevent conflicts of interest in the sector.

Views

COVID–19 pandemic
In an interview on Thmanyah in March 2020, Al-Salloum speculated an unprecedented economic depression to take place in July 2020. The rationale was based on the paralysis of daily life caused by Lockdowns, where curfews caused a real decrease in consumption levels. Accordingly, the global economy was negatively affected as a result of a series of decreases in demand on energy-products as well as many others. On the same interview, he mentioned how the global economy, including the economy of the United States, would benefit from lowering oil prices during the pandemic, which contradicted the United States' presidential political view on oversupplying the oil markets.

As for regional economies, Kuwait's in particular, Al-Salloum warned that generous economic packages for the private sector will not be feasible for the economy when viewed in a macroeconomic perspective. He believes the private sector does not weigh enough Export-driven value in the gross-domestic-product's equation. In terms of 2020 budget deficit in Kuwait, he believes the pandemic was not the real cause, but an accelerator. He also believes a conditional Public Debt Bill would be the best available option when other reforming Legislations pass in parallel, in particular, the ones designated to accelerate the Export-based private sector.

Economy of Kuwait
In a study he has published in Alqabas newspaper, as well as in other interviews, Al-Salloum illustrated how the economy of Kuwait is driven by formulas whose heavy-weighted variables are out of local control. He demonstrated how the factors of those variables are changing in an exponential manner; pressuring future economic circumstances to be even more severe. He concluded that future economy-related decisions must consider a sustainable positive outcome for the gross domestic product equation, which only occurs by stimulating exports, shortening imports, or both concurrently.

Budget deficits in Kuwait
In another study he has published in Kuwait Times newspaper, Al-Salloum concluded that financial waste, corruption, isolation of returns of sovereign funds or insufficient government operational management are not the real cause of state budget deficits but the inability to overcome macroeconomic-related issues, such as transforming the state economy to an economy that is led by an exports-based private sub-sector.

Kuwaiti vision 2035
Al-Salloum believes that Kuwaiti Vision 2035 has not followed the minimum standards of the sustainable development vision concept. His rationale was based on the insufficient methodology used to set the goals of that vision; by which a vision is just a collection of goals that will definitely be achieved once previously planned giant and large projects are executed. Hence, this vision would not require a real strategy to follow other than waiting.

Saudi vision 2030
Unlike Kuwaiti Vision 2035, Al-Salloum sees Saudi Vision 2030 as a vision that follows reasonable standards of the sustainable development vision concept; defending most of its strategies in a book of six chapters. The reason behind having Al-Salloum focusing on the Saudi Arabian economy is the belief that Kuwait's economy, once sustainable, will be attached to the closest largest economy, Saudi Arabian.

Diversified economy
Al-Salloum's advised that following the leads of macroeconomic theories will be of an added value in moving the GCC economy from oil-based to diversified. Except for Kuwait, the decision-making process in all other GCC is centralized, where following those leads – in a direct manner – can be feasibly accomplished. For Kuwait's case, however, and because of the very distributed Decision-making process made by democracy, following those leads to have an effective economic reform must have a prior political reform.

Early retirement bill
Despite the 90% government-parliament consensus on Early Retirement Bill, Al-Salloum believes such a bill should be disregarded unless there will be real political outcomes exceeding future economic losses. He sees that, if the bill passes, the Public Institution For Social Security will accelerate towards an actuarial deficit that is predicted in 2067; making it less independent and more reliant on government treasury to cover its shortages. Al-Salloum's advised that the presence of actuarial figures in governmental-parliamentary committees would fill in the gap between the two authorities in this matter. He also advised that inefficient financial management and corruption within governmental institutions must not be an excuse to pass such bills, including Loans Dropping Bill. Legislations should consider those issues instead.

Belt and road initiative
In an interview with Xinhua, Al-Salloum stated that the Belt and Road Initiative can help create jobs, increase net exports, and attract even more foreign investments, which by the end increase the overall gross domestic product. In the interview, he stated that China has the expertise, manpower and industrial and logistic production ingredients, which crave entering a market or creating a new one. Kuwait, on the other hand, according to his opinion, has a good location that can be used to create mutual interests for both countries. Hence, he sees cooperation with China will have a positive impact on the development in Kuwait and leads the country to be more exposed and to prompt legislations to facilitate international trade.

U.S. Chinese tariffs
In another interview with Xinhua, Al-Salloum showed his visualization of China overcoming the tariffs crisis as its products are no longer globally seen as second-class, which can be justified by the improved use of expertise and research and development it has. He brought up Apple as an example where products are marketed as designed in California and assembled in China.

Publications

Books
 Sultan of Najd (Arabic: سلطان نجد): (Subtitled: The throne advocating for fair wealth distribution - Arabic: الحكم المناصر لعدالة توزيع الثروة) is a political economic novel that interprets –within the ancient Ukhaydhariya State– a series of events that exposed what was unknown by the throne, not only within the monetary scope, but the state politics, where the Emir gets introduced to reforming schemes meant to achieve the state's sustainability. The title was ranked the third bestseller on Amazon's Arabic Literature and Fiction category.

 Kuwait of the Sustainability (Arabic: كويت الاستدامة): (Subtitled: Vision of a people, from and to them. - Arabic: رؤية شعب، منه وإليه.) A political economic book that extensively highlights the Kuwaiti economy in particular, aiming at clarifying the concept of sound economic vision through radical solutions targeting macro-economic issues of the state. In this title, which is introduced with appraisals by Prof. Ghanim Al-Najjar – the political science professor at Kuwait University –, Ali Al-Sanad, PhD – the Islamic studies professor at the General Authority for Applied Education and Training –, and Mr. Mohammed Al-Yousifi – the historical researcher and political analyst –, Al-Salloum looks forward to raise the awareness of the economic sense; in a way that makes individuals see and understand the consequences of political and administrative decision-making outcomes, build their own view and critical opinion while being fully aware of the subject matter. The title concludes that moving Kuwait from rent to sustainability requires a major reform at the macro-economic level, a reform whose impact would wipe all political, organizational behavioral, and micro-economic obstacles facing the state.
 Kingdom of the Vision (Arabic: مملكة الرؤية): (Subtitled: Within The Conflicts Of Sustainability And Rent - Arabic: بين مصارع الريعية والاستدامة) An economic book that extensively elaborates on Saudi Arabia's Vision 2030; linking its strategy to macroeconomics' theories. The title was ranked as best-seller on Jamalon – middle-east's largest online book retailer – as well as on Amazon's Arabic books' category.
 The Currency of Mount Serenity (Arabic: مال جبال السكينة): A novel (Subtitled: The monetary system: from favor to post-tar-inar eras - Arabic: النظام المالي بين حقبتي الامتنان وما بعد الزفتينار) that interprets – in a virtual world – the historic development eras of the real monetary system. The title was ranked as best-seller on Jamalon; middle-east's largest online books retailer.

Studies
The Truth Behind Kuwait's Budget Deficits – (February 2020) Kuwait Times Newspaper
Economy of Kuwait Is Driven By Out-of-Control Variables – (August 2019) Alqabas Newspaper

Articles
 Has the Government Program Considered the Real Flaw? – (December 2020) Alqabas Newspaper
 The Kuwaiti Dinar, Where to? – (October 2020) Thmanyah Publishing
 The Reasons Behind Generousity Differences in COVID-19's Economic Packages – (September 2020) Alqabas Newspaper
 Well-Being Within Money Eras – (September 2020) Thmanyah Publishing
 Kuwait's Economy on The Verge of No Return – (August 2020) Alqabas Newspaper
 A Recession is Closer, Thank you OPEC+ – (April 2020) Alqabas Newspaper
 Public Debt Bill is Inevitable, But..! – (April 2020) Alqabas Newspaper
 Nazahah's Memorandum of Understanding With Egypt – (December 2019) Alqabas Newspaper
 KOTS Series: Kuwait of the Sustainability – (December 2019) Alqabas Newspaper
 We Complain Whilst We're The Defect – (December 2019) Alqabas Newspaper
 KOTS Series: Vision, The Concept – (November 2019) Alqabas Newspaper
 KOTS Series: The Turning Point II – (November 2019) Alqabas Newspaper
 KOTS Series: The Turning Point I – (November 2019) Alqabas Newspaper
 KOTS Series: Management In Rentier State II – (November 2019) Alqabas Newspaper
 KOTS Series: Management In Rentier State I – (November 2019) Alqabas Newspaper
 May God Help You, First Northern Zour – (September 2019) Alqabas Newspaper
 KOTS Series: Society In Rentier State II – (October 2019) Alqabas Newspaper
 KOTS Series: Society In Rentier State I – (October 2019) Alqabas Newspaper
 KOTS Series: Realization Moment – (September 2019) Alqabas Newspaper
 KOTS Series: Introduction – (September 2019) Alqabas Newspaper
 We're The Healing That We Don't See, The Disease That We Don't Feel – (September 2019) Alqabas Newspaper
 Actuarial Implications of Early Retirement Bill – (January 2019) Aljarida Newspaper
 Loans Dropping, As If Abu Zaid Did Not Invade – (December 2018) Aljarida Newspaper
 Between The Scarcity of Housing And Aunt Hissa's Mash, There Is A Long Story – (December 2018) Aljarida Newspaper
 Democracy And Rentier State Do Not Converge – (December 2018) Aljarida Newspaper
 No Sustainability Without Private Sector's Exports – (November 2018) Aljarida Newspaper
 Constitution's Knight: The Game's Pawn – (November 2018) Aljarida Newspaper
 Saudi Aramco: Borrowing To Repurchase – (February 2018) Alphabeta Argaam
 Accelerating Entrepreneurship Remains Rentier – (February 2018) Alphabeta Argaam
 Scarcity In Fiat And Virtual Currencies – (January 2018) Alphabeta Argaam
 Ripple: The Highest ROI In 2017 – (January 2018) Alvexo News
 Bitcoin: Where to? – (December 2017) Alvexo News
 Saudi Arabian 2017–2018 Annual Report – (December 2017) Alphabeta Argaam
 Anti-Corruption In Saudi Aramco's Listing Equation – (November 2017) Alvexo News
 NEOM: Singapore Of The Red Sea – (October 2017) Alvexo News
 Baitek And Ahli United: Merger And Acquisition – (October 2017) Alphabeta Argaam
 Non-Rentier Vs. Sustainability – (October 2017) Alphabeta Argaam
 Reduction Of Retirement Age: The Actuarial Perspective – (September 2017) Alphabeta Argaam
 Diseconomies Of Scale In E-Businesses – (September 2017) Alphabeta Argaam
 Artificial Intelligence In Business Decision Making – (September 2017) Alphabeta Argaam
 JASTA And The IPO Of Saudi Aramco – (September 2017) Alphabeta Argaam
 Pricey Criteria Towards Reasoning – (August 2017) Alqabas Newspaper
 Islamic Finance and ISIS – (July 2017) Alqabas Newspaper
 Wobbling Bridge – (July 2017) Alqabas Newspaper
 Technical Analysis On Thursday's Plate – (June 2017) Alqabas Newspaper
 Sustainability Of Mash And An Actuarial Cinnamon – (June 2017) Alqabas Newspaper
 Sovereign Funds, And Youth – (May 2017) Alqabas Newspaper
 Your Highness, Don't Use Others' Excuse! – (May 2017) Alqabas Newspaper
 Injustice Towards The Minister – (May 2017) Alqabas Newspaper
 Citizens And Expatriates Are Equal Towards A Country's Wealth – (April 2017) Alqabas Newspaper
 Economic Philosophy And Monetary Systems – (April 2017) Alqabas Newspaper
 Santiago And The Investments Of Our Sovereign Funds – (March 2017) Alqabas Newspaper
 The Sustainability Of A Competitive Business Environment And Foreign Residents – (March 2017) Aljarida Newspaper
 The Valuation Of Saudi Aramco – (March 2017) Alqabas and Elaph Newspapers
 Our Vision And Theirs – (February 2017) Alqabas Newspaper

Dhammin
Al-Salloum has founded Dhammin (Arabic: ضمّن); a smart political platform that manages candidates' electoral campaigns for the National Assembly, Municipal council or Cooperative Society councils. It has been stated in news reports and interviews that the platform is the first within the field to apply distributed-systems' methodologies.

Accounting techniques 

Al-Salloum has developed – then dedicated to public domain – new accounting techniques using an open-source code and gave it a – CC0 – license to be developed and republished as part of social responsibility. The techniques help businesspeople to easily create qualified and advanced feasibility studies (managerial, technical, financial and market feasibility, as well as pricing mechanism) by inserting basic information. These techniques also assist Households rationalize their Expenses, to either raise savings or lower liabilities, with a minimum lifestyle change. The techniques have expanded to determine the valuation of running businesses for the purpose of acquisition or sale; creating more efficient negotiation outcomes. Al-Salloum has given free workshops on how such techniques can be used to get more realistic and reasonable results.

In November 2019, Al-Salloum, as the author of these accounting techniques, received the Award of Youth Volunteer and Humanitarian Initiatives Forum, along with 14 others out of 620 initiatives participating from 16 different Arab countries.

Awards 
 Award of Youth Volunteer and Humanitarian Initiatives Forum

References

External links 
 

Gulf University for Science and Technology alumni
Kuwaiti economists
Kuwaiti writers
1981 births
Kuwaiti businesspeople
Living people
21st-century Kuwaiti businesspeople